American R&B singer and songwriter Miguel has released four studio albums, twenty-two singles, four mixtapes and seven EPs.

Studio albums

Extended plays

Mixtapes

Singles

As lead artist

As featured artist

Promotional singles

Other charted and certified songs

Guest appearances

Production discography

Music videos

As lead artist

Notes

References

Discographies of American artists
Rhythm and blues discographies
Pop music discographies